Budd may refer to:

People
 Budd (given name)
 Budd (surname)

Places
 Budd Coast, Wilkes Land, Antarctica
 Budd Creek, California
 Budd Peak (Enderby Land), Antarctica
 Budd Peak (Heard Island), Indian Ocean
 Budd Pass
 Budd Inlet, a southern arm of Puget Sound, Washington
 Budd Lake (disambiguation)
 Budd, Manitoba, Canada; see Budd station

Other uses
 Budd (shirtmakers), a high-end London tailor
 Budd Company, a metal fabricator and major supplier of body components to the automobile industry
 Budd (EP), by Rapeman
 Budd Rail Diesel Car

See also
 Budd–Chiari syndrome, the clinical picture caused by occlusion of the hepatic vein or inferior vena cava
 East Budd Island, Mac. Robertson Land, Antarctica
 West Budd Island, Mac. Robertson Land, Antarctica